Jeffrey Glen Stone (born December 26, 1960) is a retired Major League Baseball left fielder, playing eight seasons at the major league level for the Philadelphia Phillies, Baltimore Orioles, Texas Rangers, and Boston Red Sox.

Stone was signed by the Phillies as an amateur free agent in 1979 out of North Pemiscot High School in Wardell, MO. He played his first professional season with their Class A (Short Season) Central Oregon Phillies in 1980. In 1981, Stone played for Class A Spartanburg, where he stole 123 bases while being caught just 13 times, and the next year, he stole 94 bases while at Class A Peninsula of the Carolina League. In 1983, Stone was named the MVP of the Eastern League.

Stone was a journeyman major leaguer for Philadelphia, Baltimore, Texas, and Boston from 1983 to 1990, dividing his playing time between the majors and the Class AAA affiliates of those four clubs. In 1990, Stone achieved one of the highlights of his career. After entering the game as a pinch hitter earlier in the night, Stone lined a walk off single against the Blue Jays to help the Red Sox maintain a hold on 1st place over the 2nd place Blue Jays.   It was a key win as the Red Sox held off the Blue Jays to win the AL East in 1990. His last professional season was 1992, playing for Triple-A teams of the Detroit Tigers (Toledo Mud Hens), Philadelphia (Scranton/Wilkes-Barre Red Barons), and the Cincinnati Reds (Nashville Sounds).

References

External links

Jeff Stone at SABR (Baseball BioProject)

1960 births
Living people
African-American baseball players
Baltimore Orioles players
Baseball players from Missouri
Boston Red Sox players
Major League Baseball outfielders
People from Kennett, Missouri
Philadelphia Phillies players
Texas Rangers players
Nashville Sounds players
Portland Beavers players
Pawtucket Red Sox players
Rochester Red Wings players
Toledo Mud Hens players
Central Oregon Phillies players
Maine Guides players
Oklahoma City 89ers players
Peninsula Pilots players
Scranton/Wilkes-Barre Red Barons players
Spartanburg Phillies players
21st-century African-American people
20th-century African-American sportspeople